Eyvind is a masculine given name. Its variant is Eivind. Notable people with the name include:

Eyvind Alnæs (1872–1932), Norwegian composer, pianist, organist and choir director
Eyvind Andersen (1874–1939), Norwegian judge
Eyvind Bødtker (1867–1932), Norwegian chemist
Eyvind Braggart, one of Queen Gunnhild's brothers, a character in Egil's Saga
Eyvind Bratt (1907–1987), Swedish diplomat
Eyvind Brynildsen (born 1988), Norwegian rally driver
Eyvind Earle (1916–2000), American artist, author and illustrator
Eyvind Finnson, 10th-century Norwegian skald
Eyvind Getz (1888–1956), Norwegian barrister and mayor of Oslo, Norway
Eyvind Fjeld Halvorsen (1922–2013), Norwegian philologist
Eyvind Hellstrøm (born 1948), chef & formerly part owner of Bagatelle restaurant, Oslo
Eyvind Johan-Svendsen (1896–1946), Danish stage and film actor
Eyvind Johnson (1900–1976), Swedish novelist and short story writer
Eyvind Kang (born 1971), composer and violist
Eyvind Lambi, Norwegian Viking and hersir of the late ninth and early tenth centuries
Eyvind Mehle (1895–1945), Norwegian radio personality, media professor and Nazi collaborator
Eyvind Skeie (born 1947), Norwegian priest and author
Eyvind Solås (1937–2011), Norwegian musician, composer, actor and program host in NRK
Halvdan Eyvind Stokke (1900–1977), Norwegian railway director and Mayor of Oslo
Pehr Eyvind Svinhufvud (1861–1944), the third President of Finland from 1931 to 1937
Eyvind W. Wang (born 1942), Norwegian politician for the Conservative Party
Eyvind Wichmann (1928–2019), American theoretical physicist

See also
Evin
Eyvindr skáldaspillir, 10th-century Norwegian skald

Masculine given names
Norwegian masculine given names

es:Eyvind